István Juhász (born 5 June 1931) is a Hungarian boxer. He competed in the men's lightweight event at the 1952 Summer Olympics.

References

External links
 

1931 births
Living people
Hungarian male boxers
Olympic boxers of Hungary
Boxers at the 1952 Summer Olympics
People from Kecskemét
Lightweight boxers
Sportspeople from Bács-Kiskun County
20th-century Hungarian people